Pseudhammus is a genus of longhorn beetles of the subfamily Lamiinae, containing the following species:

subgenus Allardhammus
 Pseudhammus rousseti Teocchi, Jiroux & Sudre, 2004

subgenus Litigiosus
 Pseudhammus alboplagiatus Breuning, 1935
 Pseudhammus burgeoni Breuning, 1935
 Pseudhammus congoanus (Duvivier, 1891)
 Pseudhammus congolensis (Hintz, 1913)
 Pseudhammus occidentalis (Dillon & Dillon, 1959)
 Pseudhammus occipitalis (Lameere, 1893)
 Pseudhammus oculifrons (Chevrolat, 1856)
 Pseudhammus rothschildi Gahan, 1909
 Pseudhammus similis (Dillon & Dillon, 1959)
 Pseudhammus vicinus Breuning, 1935

subgenus Pseudhammus
 Pseudhammus affinis Dillon & Dillon, 1959
 Pseudhammus albovariegatus Breuning, 1954
 Pseudhammus discoideus (Harold, 1879)
 Pseudhammus feae Aurivillius, 1910
 Pseudhammus impressifrons Dillon & Dillon, 1959
 Pseudhammus longicornis Dillon & Dillon, 1959
 Pseudhammus myrmidonum Kolbe, 1894
 Pseudhammus rhamnus Dillon & Dillon, 1959
 Pseudhammus shari Dillon & Dillon, 1959
 Pseudhammus vittatus Aurivillius, 1927

References

 
Lamiini